Coomacarrea is a 772 m (2,533 ft) mountain in County Kerry, Ireland.

Geography 
The mountain is part of the Mountains of the Iveragh Peninsula and is the highest peak of the Glenbeigh Horseshoe.

See also 

Lists of mountains in Ireland
List of mountains of the British Isles by height
List of Marilyns in the British Isles
List of Hewitt mountains in England, Wales and Ireland

References

Hewitts of Ireland
Marilyns of Ireland
Mountains and hills of County Kerry
Mountains under 1000 metres